"Sexy and I Know It" is a hit song by American duo LMFAO from their second studio album, Sorry for Party Rocking. It was released as the third single from the album on September 16, 2011. The song was written by Stefan Kendal Gordy, GoonRock, Erin Beck, George M. Robertson and Kenneth Oliver, and it was produced by Party Rock. It went to number one on the Billboard Hot 100 on January 7, 2012, and remained there for two weeks.

The song became LMFAO's second number one hit on the Billboard Hot 100 in the United States (after "Party Rock Anthem"), making them the first duo to have two successive number-one singles since Outkast's "Hey Ya!" (2003) and "The Way You Move" (2004). The song also reached number one in Australia, Canada, Israel and New Zealand, and charted within the top ten in nearly every country in which it charted.

Commercial performance
"Sexy And I Know It" debuted at number 76 on the week issue of September 17, 2011, on the US Billboard Hot 100. It later moved to number 50 being the greatest gainer of the week. The song launched into number 25 on the week of October 1, 2011. It jumped into the Top 10 the next week being LMFAO's second Top 10 hit behind Party Rock Anthem. The song peaked at number two on the week of November 19, 2011, being blocked by Rihanna's "We Found Love". It stayed at the position for seven consecutive weeks before hitting the top on the week of January 7, 2012. It remained in the Hot 100 for 42 weeks.

Music video
The music video for "Sexy and I Know It" was filmed in Venice, California, and uploaded on LMFAO's YouTube channel on September 16, 2011. It features Redfoo and a group of men including Hok from Quest Crew, Shuffle Bot, Nathan Pasley and Q dancing around town in speedos in front of women. In several scenes it shows Redfoo lifting weights. Chelsea Korka, Ron Jeremy, Wilmer Valderrama, Alistair Overeem, Victor Kim, Steve Terada, Lola Blanc, Ryan Conferido, Ryan Feng of Quest Crew, Mindy Robinson, Jamie Foxx, Angelo Marconi, Darren Mabee, Darla George, and Simon Rex all have cameos in the video.  The music video on YouTube has been flagged for sexual content several times since its release. The final shot of the video pays homage to the final shot of Michael Jackson's Thriller: it shows Shuffle Bot leaving with the girls while it turns its head towards the camera behind it and the image freezes.

Track listing
CD single
"Sexy and I Know It" (album version) – 3:19
"Sexy and I Know It" (Mord Fustang) – 5:21

Digital download
"Sexy and I Know It" (Audiobot Remix) – 5:55
"Sexy and I Know It" (Mord Fustang Remix) – 5:19
"Sexy and I Know It" (Tomba and Borgore Remix) – 3:41
"Sexy and I Know It" (LA Riots Remix) – 5:40
"Sexy and I Know It" (DallasK Remix) – 5:42
"Sexy and I Know It" (Fuego's Moombahton Remix) – 3:51
"Sexy and I Know It" (MADEin82 Remix ft Sky Blu) – 6:01

Credits and personnel
Lead vocals – LMFAO
Producers – Party Rock
Lyrics – Stefan Kendal Gordy, Jamahl Listenbee, Erin Beck, George M. Robertson, Kenneth Oliver
Label: Interscope

Charts

Weekly charts

Year-end charts

Decade-end charts

All-time charts

Certifications

Release history

Glee cast featuring Ricky Martin version 
In 2012, the Glee cast recorded a Spanglish cover of the song, featuring Puerto Rican singer Ricky Martin. The song was released as single from Glee: The Music, The Complete Season Three, in 2012, and it reached number 81 on the Billboard Hot 100.

See also
 List of number-one dance singles of 2011 (U.S.)
 List of best-selling singles in Australia

References

External links
Official Website

LMFAO songs
2011 singles
Number-one singles in Australia
Number-one singles in Israel
Number-one singles in New Zealand
Canadian Hot 100 number-one singles
Song recordings produced by GoonRock
Billboard Hot 100 number-one singles
Songs written by Erin Beck
Songs written by Redfoo
2011 songs
Interscope Records singles